Lee Hak-jin (born 20 August 1985) is a South Korean luger. He competed in the men's singles event at the 2002 Winter Olympics in which he placed 36th.

References

External links
 
 

1985 births
Living people
South Korean male lugers
Olympic lugers of South Korea
Lugers at the 2002 Winter Olympics
People from Gimcheon
Sportspeople from North Gyeongsang Province